Ayana Jean "A.J." Whitaker (born August 16, 1992) is an American professional volleyball player for Pallavolo Hermaea of the Italian Serie A2. She played collegiate volleyball at Cal State Fullerton and Loyola Marymount University. She primarily plays the position of Middle Blocker, but also played Opposite early on in her career. Whitaker graduated from Vista Murrieta High School of Murrieta, California in 2010.

Early career 
Born and raised in Southern California, Whitaker got a late start in athletics. Beginning her freshman year of high school, she competed in Varsity Track and Field earning all-league first team recognition and scholar athlete honors, followed by joining the school's volleyball team her senior year. By the season's end, Whitaker inked a deal to play volleyball for the California State University Fullerton Titans, an NCAA Division I school, in 2010. In her first stand-out season with the Titans, Whitaker becomes a part of school history with a Big West Championship Win, securing a spot in the 2010 NCAA Championship. After two years with the Titans, Whitaker opted to use a red-shirt year and to transfer to Loyola Marymount University to begin the 2013–2014 season. During the hiatus between teams, Whitaker signed on with the Los Angeles Clippers of the NBA as a Cheerleader of the Crowd Crew, one of the teams many entertainment squads.

In 2014, Whitaker attended tryouts for the USA Women's National team at the Olympic Training Center in Colorado Springs, Colorado. Whitaker was selected for the 2014 U.S. Collegiate National team roster, but due to a knee injury was unable to compete with the team.

Professional career 

In 2015 Whitaker begins training in Huittinen, Finland with LP Vampula of Finland's first-division Lentopallon Mestaruusliigassa. After competing in the 2015-2016 preseason with LP Vampula, Whitaker returned to the USA due to a family emergency. In July 2016, Whitaker signs a contract with the Italian team Pallavolo Hermaea of Serie A2.

References

1992 births
Living people
American women's volleyball players
Middle blockers
Opposite hitters
Cal State Fullerton Titans women's volleyball players
Loyola Marymount Lions women's volleyball players
Expatriate volleyball players in Finland
Expatriate volleyball players in Italy
American expatriate sportspeople in Finland
American expatriate sportspeople in Italy
21st-century American women